Catherine of Gorizia (died 1391) was a daughter of Count Meinhard VI of Gorizia and his first wife Catherine of Pfannberg.

In 1372, she married Duke John II of Bavaria-Munich.  They had three children:
 Ernest, Duke of Bavaria-Munich (born: 1373; died: 2 July 1438 in Munich)
 William III, Duke of Bavaria-Munich (born: 1375 in Munich; died: 1435 in Munich)
 Sofia of Bavaria (born: 1376; died: 26 September 1425 in Bratislava), married on 2 May 1389 in Prague with King Wenceslaus

Year of birth uncertain
14th-century German women
14th-century births
1391 deaths
German countesses
14th-century German nobility